Mamadouba Soumah (born 1942) is a Guinean former footballer. He competed in the men's tournament at the 1968 Summer Olympics.

References

External links
 
 

1942 births
Living people
Guinean footballers
Guinea international footballers
Olympic footballers of Guinea
Footballers at the 1968 Summer Olympics
People from Kindia
Association football defenders
Hafia FC players